The 94th District of the Iowa House of Representatives in the state of Iowa.

Current elected officials
Gary Mohr is the representative currently representing the district.

Past representatives
The district has previously been represented by:
 Thomas M. Dougherty, 1971–1973
 Quentin V. Anderson, 1973–1975
 Arlo Hullinger, 1975–1981
 Joe Gross, 1981–1983
 William H. Harbor, 1983–1993
 Robert L. Kistler, 1993–1995
 Jerry D. Main, 1995–1997
 Rebecca Reynolds, 1997–2003
 Kurt Swaim, 2003–2013
 Linda Miller, 2013–2016
 Gary Mohr, 2017–present

References

094